The South African Bank Note Company (SABN) is a South African security printing company responsible for the printing of the South African Rand. It is a wholly owned subsidiary of the South African Reserve Bank.

History
The South African Bank Note Company was established in 1958 as a result of a decision by the South African Government to print South African currency locally. 
The South African Reserve Bank formed a joint venture with Bradbury Wilkinson and Company and commenced production from a factory in Pretoria. Bradbury Wilkinson and Company's shareholding was eventually taken over by the South African Reserve Bank.

References 
 Citations

Finance in South Africa
Manufacturing companies based in the City of Tshwane
Banknote printing companies